Sir Kenneth Whistler Street,  (28 January 1890 – 15 February 1972) was the 10th Chief Justice of the Supreme Court of New South Wales and Lieutenant-Governor of New South Wales. These offices were held before him by his father Sir Philip Whistler Street and after by his son Sir Laurence Whistler Street, the only such viceregal succession in Australian history.

Street enlisted in the British Army in the First World War and was deployed to France in September 1914 to fight with the Duke of Cornwall's Light Infantry. He later rose to the rank of lieutenant colonel in the Citizens Military Force. He was a lecturer at Sydney Law School and husband to Jessie Mary Grey, Lady Street, Australia's first female delegate to the United Nations.

Early years
Street was born on 28 January 1890 in Woollahra, the eldest son of Sir Philip Whistler Street and his Melbourne wife Belinda Maud (née Poolman). He attended Homebush Grammar School, Sydney Grammar School and Sydney Law School (B.A., 1911; LL.B., 1914), winning scholarships in law. On 29 September 1914, he enlisted to serve in the First World War with the Duke of Cornwall's Light Infantry in France. He was made a lieutenant of the 18th (North Sydney) Infantry Regiment in December 1915, and promoted to captain in September 1917, serving in the Adjutant General's Department, Army Headquarters, Melbourne. His younger brother Lieutenant Laurence Whistler Street was a fellow Sydney Law School student who enlisted before him and was killed in action during the Gallipoli campaign at age 21. Street named his son Laurence in his brother's honour.

Judicial career
Between 1921 and 1927, Street lectured part time at Sydney Law School. Meanwhile, he continued his career in the Militia as a legal staff officer (1922–28) and rose to the rank of lieutenant colonel. Street enjoyed a wide general practice and would have taken silk but for his appointment to serve on the reconstituted Industrial Commission of New South Wales from 16 December 1927. He was elevated as a judge of the Supreme Court on 7 October 1931. He thus joined the bench of which his father was then Chief Justice, the first and only such case in Australian history. In 1949, as senior puisne judge, Street acted as Chief Justice when Sir Frederick Jordan died. Confirmed in that office from 6 January 1950, he was sworn in on 7 February, thus becoming the second of three consecutive generations of the Street family to serve as Chief Justice and Lieutenant-Governor of New South Wales.

Further details

As well as being a jurist, Street was a considerable scholar outside the law, being an authority on the writings of Pepys and an accomplished Latinist. In 1951, he was made a Knight of Grace of the Order of St John of Jerusalem. In 1952, he was awarded an honorary Doctor of Laws by the University of Sydney. In 1956, he was made Knight Commander of the Order of St Michael and St George. He retired from the bench on his 70th birthday, as did his father. Sir Kenneth died peacefully on 15 February 1972 and had a state funeral at St Andrew's Cathedral, Sydney. Street House at Cranbrook School, Sydney was named in his honour.

Family
Street married Jessie Mary Grey Lillingston, daughter of Charles Alfred Gordon Lillingston and Mabel Harriet Ogilvie, who was in turn the daughter of Australian politician Edward David Stuart Ogilvie and Theodosia Isabella Ogilvie (née de Burgh). His wife was a prominent suffragette who served as Australia's first female delegate to the United Nations. Sir Kenneth and Jessie had four children, Belinda, Roger, Philippa, who married the Australian Test cricketer Jack Fingleton, and Sir Laurence.

References

1890 births
1972 deaths
Chief Justices of New South Wales
Lieutenant-Governors of New South Wales
Judges of the Supreme Court of New South Wales
Australian Knights Commander of the Order of St Michael and St George
Knights of Grace of the Order of St John
People educated at Sydney Grammar School
Kenneth
British Army personnel of World War I
Duke of Cornwall's Light Infantry officers
Australian Army officers